Judge Dredd: Wanted: Dredd or Alive is the first full-cast audio drama produced by Big Finish Productions based on characters from the British comic 2000 AD. Released in March 2002, it features the character Judge Dredd, created for the comic in 1977, and introduces Amy Steel, a BritCit-born Judge living in Mega-City One. The two team up in other subsequent audio dramas, becoming trusted allies. The story stars Toby Longworth as Judge Dredd and Claire Buckfield as Amy Steel and is directed by Nicholas Briggs. As with the standard 2000 AD stories of Judge Dredd, Wanted: Dredd or Alive takes place 122 years in the future of when the story is released (unless otherwise specified).

Plot
In 2124, it is exactly one year after the death of Flabby Broccoli, boss of the "Frendz" crime syndicate in Mega City-One, a metropolis governed by the judges and spanning much of the North American East Coast. The Frendz syndicate is now under the control of "the Boss." Brisco is the third Wally Squad judge (the undercover division) to be killed while trying to infiltrate the Frendz.

Reports hit the newsfeed that some judges who overuse sleep machines (technology that allows them to experience several hours of rest in minutes) are now experiencing "sleep machine psychosis" (SMP), also loosely referred to as "mad Judge disease." The result is in an unbalanced mind and then death. A source tells reporter Enigma Smith that SMP seems strongest among clone judges (such as Judge Dredd who was cloned from Eustace Fargo, the founder of the Judge System). Despite these reports, Dredd uses a sleep machine again after working for 24 hours straight. After waking up, he attacks a technician, then leaves.

A former native of BritCit (the mega-city occupying England), Amy Steel is a cadet at the Academy of Law in Mega-City One and on her way to becoming a full street judge after thirteen years of training. On her 18th birthday, she is given a rookie half-eagle badge by Chief Judge Hershey and assigned to the supervision of Joe Dredd for a final 12-hour assessment on the streets of MC1. Dredd and Steel come across a wild gunman and Steel kills him before he can harm others. Seeing Steel is unsettled by her actions, Dredd assures her she did the right thing. As the day continues, Steel notices Dredd having bouts of unprovoked aggression. After he attacks a citizen without good cause, Steel concludes he is suffering from SMP. Dredd seems confused and escapes.

After making more attacks and seemingly contemplating suicide, Dredd forces the staff of a face-change clinic to alter his appearance. He later calls Judge Hershey, having known her since their space mission together to find The Judge Child, and demands safe passage out of MC1. The Boss intercepts the call and sends Frendz hitman Cosmo Jones to find Dredd. Steel sees Cosmo and Dredd leaving and reports it. Despite being told not to intervene, she follows.

Cosmo offers Dredd to be cryogenically frozen before SMP kills him, allowing him to wait for a cure, in exchange for information on the Judges and the city's top security codes. Dredd is taken to Frendz headquarters, a large hover ship, and discovers the Boss is the 13-year-old daughter of Flabby Broccoli. Dredd attacks, revealing he never intended an alliance. To his surprise, she fights back effectively, thanks to cyborg enhancements.

Steel arrives at the hover ship and is immediately fired upon. She is told to hold her ground and wait for back-up, but believes she will be killed before that happens. Pretending not to hear Hershey's objections, she uses Cosmo's van to ram through the hover ship hull, then kills Cosmo. She confronts the Boss and Dredd, realizes the situations, and shoots the Boss. Dredd willingly lets Steel arrest him.

Amy learns there is no such thing as sleep machine psychosis. It was all a ruse to help Dredd infiltrate the Frendz and find the Boss after losing so many Wally Squad judges. The people Dredd seemingly attacked were undercover operatives. Hershey and Dredd both think Steel's refusal to follow orders endangered the case, but Dredd still recommends she will make a good judge. Steel officially graduates as a street judge with a full eagle badge. Dredd, his face restored, tells Steel he would be honored to ride alongside her in the future but warns she should not disobey orders and procedure again.

Production 
Wanted: Dredd or Alive was David Bishop's first time writing an audio drama, but he continued to write more stories for Big Finish and develop the character of Amy Steel. Claire Buckfield felt that understanding the world and character of Judge Dredd was something she was "struggling with a bit" at first because she was unfamiliar with the comic. Adding to this was the fact that the production schedule for the episode meant she and Toby Longworth were recorded separately. But Buckfield quickly came to enjoy the stories and appreciated having more freedom to "invent" some of the character and personality of Amy Steel since she had no established history in the comics, particularly as the audios soon developed Steel into a confident, trusted Judge whose personality contrasted with Dredd's.

In a behind the scenes discussion included with the audio drama Judge Dredd: Get Karter!, Toby Longworth said that recording Wanted: Dredd or Alive was a different experience for him since he was very familiar with the character, having been a fan of 2000 AD since its first issue. While this gave him the advantage of knowledge, he said it also made adapting the role intimidating because he was aware that many fans already had their own imagined version of Judge Dredd's voice. He hoped that even if his voice was different from what they imagined, his performance would grow on them, and noted that he saw a similarity between Dredd and Clint Eastwood's characters of the Man with No Name and Dirty Harry (the latter of whom has been said by Dredd creator John Wagner to have been an influence). Longworth found the idea of adapting the visual medium of comic books into an audio format to be challenging and interesting. In the same discussion, writer David Bishop joked that an advantage in adapting Dredd to audio was that the judges were constantly in conversation with others via radio and had voice-activated guns requiring them to verbally clarify what kind of round they were firing before they fired.

Cast
Toby Longworth - Judge Dredd
Claire Buckfield - Amy Steel
Teresa Gallagher - Chief Judge Hershey
Regina Reagan - Enigma Smith
Jeremy James - Control
Stewart Alexander - Cadet Baker

References

External links
Big Finish Productions

2002 audio plays
Judge Dredd